"Gloria" is a rock song written by Irish singer-songwriter Van Morrison, and originally recorded by Morrison's band Them in 1964. It was released as the B-side of "Baby, Please Don't Go". The song became a garage rock staple and a part of many rock bands' repertoires.

Composition and recording
According to Morrison, he wrote "Gloria" while performing with the Monarchs in Germany in the summer of 1963, at just about the time he turned 18 years old. He started to perform it at the Maritime Hotel when he returned to Belfast and joined up with the Gamblers to form the band Them. He would ad-lib lyrics as he performed, sometimes stretching the song to 15 or 20 minutes. After signing a contract with Dick Rowe and Decca, Them went to London for a recording session at Decca Three Studios in West Hampstead on 5 April 1964; "Gloria" was one of the seven songs recorded that day.

Besides Morrison, present were Billy Harrison on guitar, Alan Henderson on bass, Ronnie Millings on drums and Pat McCauley on organ. Rowe brought in session musicians Arthur Greenslade on organ and Bobby Graham on drums, since he considered the Them members too inexperienced. There remains some dispute about whether Millings and McCauley were actually miked, but Alan Henderson contends that Them constituted the first rock group to use two drummers on a recording. Although some sources claim that Jimmy Page played second guitar, other sources deny this.

Releases and charts
Decca Records released "Gloria" as the B-side of "Baby, Please Don't Go" in the UK on 6 November 1964, with only the latter reaching the singles chart. In the US, the same pairing was released by Parrot Records, which became a regional hit on the US West Coast.  Between March and June 1965, the single (both songs) appeared on weekly Top 40 playlists for Los Angeles radio station KRLA, reaching number one for three weeks in April. A year later, after the release of a cover version of "Gloria" by the Shadows of Knight, Them's original entered the national Billboard Hot 100 chart. Both peaked during the week of 14 May 1966, with Them at number 75 and the Shadows of Knight at number 10.  Cash Box described it as "a bluesy, up tempo stomp'er devoted to 'Gloria.

"Gloria" was added to Them's first UK album The Angry Young Them (1965), which was re-titled with some different tracks as Them in the US. The song also appears on several compilations, including The Story of Them Featuring Van Morrison (1997) and The Best of Van Morrison (1990).

Cover versions
1965The Shadows of Knight recorded "Gloria", which was released as a single in December 1965 and later included on the album of the same name. Janovitz describes it as "a faithful, though tamer version of the original". The song reached number 10 on the Billboard Hot 100 in 1966, due to its popularity with radio stations that chose not to play Them's original because of its lyricsthe Shadows of Knight replaced Morrison's line "She comes to my room" with "She calls out my name".
1966–1970The Doors performed the song several times, with one recording released on Alive, She Cried (1983). It was also released as a single, which reached number 18 on Hot Mainstream Rock Tracks and number 71 on Billboard Hot 100 in 1983.  The song is included on Legacy: The Absolute Best (2003) and The Very Best of The Doors (2007).
1975Patti Smith recorded it for her album Horses. Based on the Van Morrison tune, the lyrics had been adapted from an early poem, 'Oath'. Smith's band had started to play the song live and merged it with the poem by 1974. It meant that the song would contain half Smith's own words. For the recording of her debut album, Smith and her band recorded the song live and, after mixing, chose it as the album's opener. The spoken intro begins, "Jesus died for somebody's sins, but not mine," being the statement of the album. According to Janovitz, "Smith's intermingling of lascivious sex and religious guilt (or lack thereof) certainly foreshadows similar sacred/profane juxtapositions from ultra-feminine Madonna and androgynous Prince."
1993Van Morrison recorded a version with John Lee Hooker, which reached the Top 40 in several countries: Irish Singles Chart No. 17, UK Singles Chart No. 31, US Hot Mainstream Rock Tracks No. 36, AUS No. 22 and the Netherlands No. 37.

Recognition
One explanation for the timeless popularity of the song was offered in AllMusic's review by Bill Janovitz:

"Gloria" was rated number 69 on Dave Marsh's list in the 1989 book The Heart of Rock & Soul: The 1001 Greatest Singles Ever Made. He described the song as "one of the few rock songs that's actually as raunchy as its reputation."

In his book Rock and Roll: The 100 Best Singles, Paul Williams said about the two sides of the "Baby Please Don't Go/Gloria" recording: "Into the heart of the beast ... here is something so good, so pure, that if no other hint of it but this record existed, there would still be such a thing as rock and roll ... Van Morrison's voice a fierce beacon in the darkness, the lighthouse at the end of the world. Resulting in one of the most perfect rock anthems known to humankind."

In 1999, "Gloria" by Them received the Grammy Hall of Fame Award. In 2000, "Gloria"  by Them was listed as number 81 on VH1's list of The 100 Greatest Rock Songs of All Time. In 2004, "Gloria" by Them was ranked No. 208 on Rolling Stones list of the 500 Greatest Songs of All Time, moving down to No. 211 in the 2010 updated list, and 413 in the 2021 list. Patti Smith's version was ranked at number 97 on the 2021 list. "Gloria" was also included in The Rock and Roll Hall of Fame's 500 Songs that Shaped Rock and Roll twice: by Patti Smith and by Shadows of Knight.

References

Sources
 
 
 Heylin, Clinton (2003). Can You Feel the Silence? Van Morrison: A New Biography, Chicago Review Press 
 Turner, Steve (1993). Van Morrison: Too Late to Stop Now, Viking Penguin, 

1964 songs
1965 singles
1974 singles
1976 singles
1993 singles
Songs written by Van Morrison
Them (band) songs
Van Morrison songs
Patti Smith songs
The Doors songs
Eddie and the Hot Rods songs
Grammy Hall of Fame Award recipients
Decca Records singles
Parrot Records singles
Warner Records singles
Polydor Records singles
Mercury Records singles
Arista Records singles